Mercy Willard Hospital is a hospital in Willard, Ohio and is part of Mercy Health Partners.

References

External links
Mercy Hospital Willard
Mercy Hospitals
Mercy Hospital of Willard

Hospitals in Ohio